The 1977 Ohio Bobcats football team was an American football team that represented Ohio University in the Mid-American Conference (MAC) during the 1977 NCAA Division I football season. In their 20th season under head coach Bill Hess, the Bobcats compiled a 1–10 record (0–8 against MAC opponents), finished in last place in the MAC, and were outscored by all opponents by a combined total of 371 to 241.  They played their home games in Peden Stadium in Athens, Ohio.

Schedule

References

Ohio
Ohio Bobcats football seasons
Ohio Bobcats football